Anna MacGillivray Macleod DSc (15 May 1917 – 13 August 2004) was a Scottish biochemist and academic, an authority on brewing and distilling. She was a professor at Heriot-Watt University in Edinburgh. She was the world's first female Professor of Brewing and Biochemistry.

Family
Born in Kirkhill, she was the daughter of Margaret Ingram Sangster and Rev. Alasdair MacGillivray Macleod. Her family lineage traces to the Isle of Lewis, where her grandfather, Rev. George Macleod, was the Minister of Garrabost. Her father was also born on the Isle of Lewis. She was second cousin to politician and former Chancellor of the Exchequer, Iain Norman Macleod. Her family belongs to the branch of the Macleods of Pabbay and Uig.

Her father, Rev. Alasdair MacGillivray Macleod, was a Minister of the Church, died at an early age. He and her mother, Margaret Ingram Sangster were both in 1914 graduates of Aberdeen University. Her two brothers were both doctors of medicine: her elder brother was John George Macleod, editor of Davidson's Textbook of Medicine and the author of [[Macleod's Clinical Examination]], and her younger brother was Alasdair MacGillivray Macleod, a general practitioner in Linlithgow.Education and profession
Macleod was educated at Invergordon Academy and Edinburgh Ladies' College. In 1939 she graduated from University of Edinburgh with a BSc with honours in botany. She joined the faculty of Heriot-Watt University in 1945, where she remained until her retirement in 1977. She returned in 1951 to the University of Edinburgh to study for her PhD. In the late 1960s, she was awarded a Doctor of Science, from the university, for a thesis on the germination of barley.

In 1961, together with Leslie Samuel Cobley, she co-edited "Contemporary Botanical Thought", published by Oliver and Boyd. She edited the Journal of the Institute of Brewing'' from 1964 to 1976, and she was the first female President of that organisation (now the Institute of Brewing and Distilling), from 1970 to 1972. In 1975, she was appointed Professor of Brewing at Heriot-Watt University. In 1976, she was the recipient of the Horace Brown medal. She retired in 1977, as professor emeritus.

In 1993, Heriot-Watt University awarded her an honorary Doctorate of Science for her discovery of gibberellic acid, which was an advantage for the maltsters, as it shortened the malting process. At that occasion, the Dean of the Faculty of Science, Professor Philip G. Harper, mentioned that Macleod's association with the brewing industry puts her in the same fraternity as other scientists, such as James Watt (power), Louis Pasteur (pasteurisation), Peter Griess (colour chemistry), Joseph Williams Lovibond (colour physics), Gosset (statistics) and the man after whom the medal was named. He said that she was recognised nationally and internationally with distinction as a university teacher, scholar, scientist, technologist and as a brewer.

One of her PhD students, Geoff Palmer, first worked with her on the research of barley and they published numerous papers together. He then became her successor at the Heriot-Watt University and in 2021 became the Chancellor of the same university.

Death and legacy
Anna Macleod died at St Raphaels, Edinburgh on 13 August 2004.

Heriot-Watt University's Edinburgh campus has a residence hall named in her honour.

Heriot-Watt University's International Centre for Brewing and Distilling (ICBD), as it is now called, started the Anna Macleod Scholarship with a financial gift she had bequeathed to that University in her will.

References

Sources
 The Macleods - The Genealogy of a Clan, Section Four by Alick Morrison, M.A., by Associated Clan Macleod Societies, Edinburgh, 1974
 The MacLeods - The Genealogy of a Clan, Section Four by The Late Major Loudoun Hector Davenport MacLeod, RM, 1988

External links
 Anna MacGillivray Macleod
 Heriot-Watt University and Anna MacGillivray Macleod
 Prof. Dr. Anna M. Macleod obituary in Scotsman

1917 births
2004 deaths
People educated at the Mary Erskine School
Academics of Heriot-Watt University
Alumni of the University of Edinburgh
Scottish biochemists
Scottish women scientists
20th-century British women scientists
Women biochemists
Scottish women academics